Jean-Marc Nattier (17 March 1685 – 7 November 1766) was a French painter. He was born in Paris, the second son of Marc Nattier (1642–1705), a portrait painter, and of Marie Courtois (1655–1703), a miniaturist. He is noted for his portraits of the ladies of King Louis XV's court in classical mythological attire.

Life
He received his first instruction from his father, and from his uncle, the history painter Jean Jouvenet (1644–1717). He enrolled in the Royal Academy in 1703 and applied himself to copying pictures in the Luxembourg Palace, making a series of drawings of the Marie de Médici painting cycle by Peter Paul Rubens. The publication (1710) of engravings based on these drawings made Nattier famous, but he declined to proceed to the French Academy in Rome, though he had taken the first prize at the Paris Academy at the age of fifteen. In 1715 he went to Amsterdam, where Peter the Great was then staying, and painted portraits of the tsar and the empress Catherine, but declined an offer to go to Russia.

Nattier aspired to be a history painter. Between 1715 and 1720 he devoted himself to compositions like the "Battle of Pultawa", which he painted for Peter the Great, and the "Petrification of Phineus and of his Companions", which led to his election to the Academy. He died in Paris in 1766.

Portraits

The financial collapse of 1720 caused by the schemes of Law all but ruined Nattier, who found himself forced to devote his whole energy to portraiture, which was more lucrative. He became the painter of the artificial ladies of Louis XV's court. He subsequently revived the genre of the allegorical portrait, in which a living person is depicted as a Greco-Roman goddess or other mythological figure.

Nattier's graceful and charming portraits of court ladies in this mode were very fashionable, partly because he could beautify a sitter while also retaining her likeness. The most notable examples of his straightforward portraiture are the "Marie Leczinska" at the Dijon Museum, and a group of the artist surrounded by his family,"The Artist Surrounded by His Family", dated 1730.  Another excellent example of Nattier’s work and sense of composition is his 1738 portrait of Mathilde de Carbonnel-Canisy, marquise d’Antin. The portrait is permanently exhibited at the musée Jacquemart-André in Paris and remains one of the most popular works in the Jacquemart-André Collection.

Many of his notable paintings are on permanent exhibit at major museums. Thus at the Louvre is his "Magdalen"; in the Musee Jacquemart-Andre his Portrait of Mathilde de Canisy, marquise d'Antin; at Nantes the portrait of "La Camargo" and "A Lady of the Court of Louis XV". At Orléans a "Head of a Young Girl", at Marseilles a portrait of "Mme de Pompadour", at Perpignan a portrait of Louis XV, and at Valenciennes a portrait of "Le Duc de Boufflers". The Versailles Museum owns an important group of two ladies, and the Dresden Gallery a portrait of the "Maréchal de Saxe".
At the Wallace collection Nattier is represented by "The comtesse de Tillières" (formerly known as "Portrait of a Lady in Blue"), "Mademoiselle de Clermont en sultane", and "The marquise de Belestat". In the early part of the 20th century in the collection of Mr Lionel Phillips were the duchess of Flavacourt as "Le Silence", and the duchess of Châteauroux as "Le Point du jour" (now at Marseilles). A portrait of the Comtesse de Neubourg and her Daughter formed part of the Vaile Collection, and realized 4500 guineas at the sale of this collection in 1903. Nattier's works have been engraved by Alphonse Leroy, Tardieu, Jean Audran (1667–1756), Dupin and many other noted craftsmen.The 1753 Marquis de Marigny is in the collection of the Staatliche Kunsthalle Karlsruhe.
The Getty Museum has "Madame Bonier de la Mosson as Diana", 1742. The Metropolitan Museum of Art has "Madame de Maison-Rouge as Diana", 1756. The 1744 "Duchesse de Chartres as Hebe Nationalmuseum" is in the collection of Nationalmuseum.

Select gallery

Sources
Nattier: Jean-Marc Nattier Masters in Art: A Series of Illustrated Monographs: Issued Monthly; June, 1902, Part 30, Vol. 3, (Bates & Guild Co., Boston)

References 

; Endnotes:
See "J. M. Nattier", by Paul Mantz, in the Gazette des beaux-arts (1894)
 Life of Nattier, by his daughter, Madame Tocqué
 Nattier by Pierre de Nolhac (1904, revised 1910)
 French Painters of the XVIIIth Century, by Lady Dilke (London, 1899).

1685 births
1766 deaths
Painters from Paris
Burials at Saint-Eustache, Paris
Court painters
18th-century French painters
French male painters
French history painters
French portrait painters
18th-century French male artists